Holden–Roberts Farm, also known as Rolling Acres Farm, is a historic home and farm and national historic district located near Hillsborough, Orange County, North Carolina.  The farmhouse was built in 1873–1874, and is a two-story, frame I-house, with modest Greek Revival style detailing. The house is sheathed in weatherboard, has a gable roof, and features two stately single-shouldered end chimneys. Also on the property are the contributing granary (c. 1900), three frame chicken houses (c. 1910), a brick shed-roofed garden house (c. 1915), an equipment shed (c. 1930), and two pole barns (c. 1950).  The house was built for Addison Holden, half-brother of North Carolina's Reconstruction Governor William Woods Holden.

It was listed on the National Register of Historic Places in 2002.

References

Farms on the National Register of Historic Places in North Carolina
Historic districts on the National Register of Historic Places in North Carolina
Greek Revival houses in North Carolina
Houses completed in 1874
Hillsborough, North Carolina
Buildings and structures in Orange County, North Carolina
National Register of Historic Places in Orange County, North Carolina